Grodzka Street (Polish: Ulica Grodzka, lit. Gord Street) - one of the oldest streets in Kraków, Poland. Grodzka was part of a former north-south trade route. The street is part of the Royal Route, used by Polish kings to reach Wawel Castle. The earliest documents referencing its name date from the thirteenth-century.

Part of the street was destroyed by the Kraków Fire of 1850. In the later half of the 19th century, a tramway track was laid on Grodzka Street.

Features

References

Streets in Kraków